Cast Away is a 2000 American survival drama film directed and produced by Robert Zemeckis and starring Tom Hanks, Helen Hunt, and Nick Searcy. Hanks plays a FedEx troubleshooter stranded on an uninhabited island after his plane crashes in the South Pacific, and the plot focuses on his desperate attempts to survive and return home. Initial filming took place from January to March 1999 before resuming in April 2000 and concluding that May.

Cast Away was released on December 22, 2000, by 20th Century Fox in North America and DreamWorks Pictures in its international markets. It grossed $429 million worldwide, making it the third-highest-grossing film of 2000. The film received generally positive reviews from critics, who praised its screenplay and Hanks's performance, for which he won Best Actor – Motion Picture Drama at the 58th Golden Globe Awards and was nominated for Best Actor in a Leading Role at the 73rd Academy Awards.

Plot 

In 1995, systems analyst Chuck Noland is a FedEx executive who travels the world resolving productivity problems at the company's depots. He lives with his girlfriend, Kelly Frears, in Memphis, Tennessee. The couple wants to get married, but Chuck's busy schedule prevents it. During a family Christmas dinner, Chuck is summoned to resolve a work problem in Malaysia. However, the FedEx cargo plane he is on gets caught in a violent storm and crashes into the Pacific Ocean. Chuck is the only survivor of the crash and escapes with an inflatable life raft, losing the emergency locator transmitter in the process. The next day, he washes up on an uninhabited island.

Over the next few days, several Federal Express packages wash ashore, as well as the corpse of Albert R. Miller, one of the FedEx pilots, whom Chuck buries. Chuck tries to signal a passing ship and escape in the damaged life raft, but the incoming surf tosses him onto a coral reef, injuring his leg. He finds sufficient food, water, and shelter. Chuck opens most of the packages, finding several useful items, but does not open a package with a pair of golden angel wings printed on it. While attempting to start a fire, Chuck cuts his hand. He furiously throws several objects from the packages, including a Wilson Sporting Goods volleyball, leaving a bloodstained handprint. After calming down, Chuck draws a face into the smeared blood, names the ball "Wilson", and begins talking to it. He continues to talk to it regularly during the rest of his time on the island.

Four years later, in 1999, a now long-haired, bearded, and gaunt Chuck has moved into a cave. After a large section from a portable toilet enclosure washes up on the island, he builds a raft, using the plastic as a sail. Chuck successfully launches the raft that he has stocked with water and the unopened Federal Express package. Chuck and the raft survive a storm, but afterward, Wilson falls off the raft and floats away. Chuck awakens and futilely attempts to rescue Wilson but is left to grieve over his loss. Soon after, he is rescued by a passing container ship.

Upon returning to civilization, a spruced-up and clean-shaven Chuck learns that he was declared dead by his family and friends. Later, he returns to a hero’s welcome home party at the FedEx Headquarters in Memphis. There, he learns that Kelly has since married and had a daughter. On a rainy night, Chuck visits Kelly's house and reunites with her. Although they are both still in love with each other, Chuck reminds Kelly of her responsibilities with her new family. She gives Chuck his old Jeep, and they sadly part ways. Chuck drives to Texas to return the unopened Federal Express package to its sender. Finding no one home, he leaves the package at the door with a note saying that the package saved his life. He departs in his truck (he has bought another Wilson volleyball and put it in the passenger seat) and stops at a remote crossroads. A woman in a pickup truck stops and gives information about where each road leads. As she drives away, Chuck notices two angel wings painted on the tailgate of her truck, identical to the one on the parcel. He looks down each road, trying to decide which way to go. In the end, Chuck then stares down the road the woman took and smiles.

Cast 

 Tom Hanks as Chuck Noland
 Helen Hunt as Kelly Frears Lovett
 Nick Searcy as Stan, Chuck's best friend and co-worker
 Chris Noth as Jerry Lovett, Kelly's husband
 Lari White as Bettina Peterson, the woman who sent the unopened FedEx package
 Vince Martin as Pilot Albert 'Al' Miller, who is buried by Chuck on the island
 Michael Forest as Pilot Jack
 Jay Acovone as Pilot Peter
 Garret Davis as Pilot Blaine
 Viveka Davis as Pilot Gwen
 Jenifer Lewis as Becca Twig
 Geoffrey Blake as Maynard Graham
 Nan Martin as Kelly's Mother
 Dennis Letts as Dennis Larson
 Valerie Wildman as Virginia Larson
 Steve Monroe as Steve Larson
 Elden Henson as Elden Madden
 Timothy Stack as Morgan Stockton
 Joe Conley as Joe Wally
 Frederick W. Smith as himself

Production

Development 
In a 2017 Actor Roundtable with The Hollywood Reporter, Tom Hanks stated

Filming 

The film was not shot chronologically. It began on January 18, 1999 before halting two months later. Filming resumed on April 3, 2000, and finished the following month. Hanks gained  during pre-production, for the purpose of making his transformation more dramatic. After most of the film was shot, production was paused so he could lose the weight and grow his hair and beard to look like he had been living on the island for years. Another four-month production halt preceded the filming of the return scenes. During the year-long hiatus, Zemeckis used the same film crew to make another film, What Lies Beneath. While the film was in production, Hanks nearly died when he suffered an infected cut on his leg. He was rushed to a local hospital to undergo surgery and stayed there for three days. Filming of Cast Away was suspended for three weeks to allow Hanks to recover from the injury.

Cast Away was filmed on Monuriki, one of the Mamanuca Islands in Fiji. It is in a subgroup of the Mamanuca archipelago, which is sited off the coast of Viti Levu, Fiji's largest island. The island became a tourist attraction after the film's release.

The film begins and ends in the same location, on the Arrington Ranch in the Texas Panhandle south of the city of Canadian, Texas.

Music 
The film's minimal score was composed and conducted by Alan Silvestri for which he won a Grammy Award in 2002. The film's soundtrack is most notable for its lack of score and creature sound effects (such as bird song or insect sounds) while Chuck is on the island, which is intended to reinforce the feeling of isolation. Cast Away contains no original musical score until Chuck escapes the island. However, there is a Russian choral piece heard near the start of the film that was not composed or even recorded by Silvestri, so it does not appear on the film's soundtrack list. It is a traditional Russian song written by Lev Knipper called "Oh, My Field" ("Polyushko, Polye") and it is available on various collections of Red Army hymns.

The official soundtrack CD is an anthology of musical pieces from all the films up to that point that were both directed by Zemeckis and scored by Silvestri. The only track from Cast Away itself is the theme from the end credits.

The Cast Away soundtrack consists of 10 tracks, with performers including Elvis Presley, Chuck Berry, and Charles Brown.

FedEx 
FedEx provided access to their facilities (Memphis, Los Angeles, and Moscow) as well as airplanes, trucks, uniforms, and logistical support. A team of FedEx marketers oversaw production through more than two years of filming. FedEx CEO Fred Smith made an appearance as himself for the scene where Chuck is welcomed back, which was filmed on location at FedEx's home facilities in Memphis, Tennessee. The idea of a story based on a FedEx plane crashing gave the company "a heart attack at first," but the overall story was seen as positive. FedEx, which paid no money for product placement in the film, saw an increase in brand awareness in Asia and Europe following the film's release.

Wilson the volleyball 

In the film, Wilson the volleyball serves as Chuck Noland's personified friend and only companion during the four years that Noland spends alone on a deserted island. Named after the volleyball's manufacturer, Wilson Sporting Goods, the character was created by screenwriter William Broyles Jr. While researching for the film, he consulted with professional survival experts, and then chose to deliberately strand himself for one week on an isolated beach in the Gulf of California, to force himself to search for water and food, and obtain his own shelter. During this time, a volleyball washed up on shore, providing the inspiration for the film's inanimate companion. From a screenwriting point of view, Wilson also serves to realistically allow dialogue to take place in a one-person-only situation.

It is rumored, but not true, that one of the original volleyball props was sold at auction for $18,500 to the ex-CEO of FedEx Office, Ken May. At the time of the film's release, Wilson launched its own joint promotion centered on its products "co-starring" with Tom Hanks. Wilson manufactured a volleyball with a reproduction of the bloodied handprint face on one side. It was sold for a limited time during the film's initial release and continues to be offered on the company's website.

Reception

Box office 
Cast Away opened in 2,774 theaters in North America and grossed $28.9 million (an average of $10,412 per theater) in its opening weekend. For the four-day Christmas long holiday weekend, it took in a total of $39.9 million. At that point, it had the highest Christmas opening weekend of any film, surpassing Patch Adams. Upon opening, Cast Away reached the number one spot at the box office, beating another Helen Hunt film, What Women Want. It would also compete against How the Grinch Stole Christmas, which was released the previous month. The film remained at the top of the box office for three weeks until it was overtaken by Save the Last Dance. Cast Away kept performing well and ended up earning $233.6 million domestically and $196 million internationally, for a total of $429.6 million, against its production budget of $90 million. It became the third-highest-grossing film of 2000, behind Mission: Impossible 2 and Gladiator.

Critical response 
On Rotten Tomatoes, Cast Away holds an approval rating of 89% based on 158 reviews, with an average rating of 7.40/10. The site's critical consensus reads, "Flawed but fascinating, Cast Away offers an intelligent script, some of Robert Zemeckis' most mature directing, and a showcase performance from Tom Hanks." On Metacritic, the film has a weighted average score of 73 out of 100 based on reviews from 32 critics, indicating "generally favorable reviews". Audiences polled by CinemaScore gave the film an average grade of "B" on an A+ to F scale.

Roger Ebert of the Chicago Sun-Times gave the film three stars out of four. In his review, he praised Hanks for doing "a superb job of carrying Cast Away all by himself for about two-thirds of its running time" by "never straining for effect, always persuasive even in this unlikely situation, winning our sympathy with his eyes and his body language when there's no one else on the screen." However, he also mentioned how he felt that the film is "a strong and simple story surrounded by needless complications, and flawed by a last act that disappoints us and then ends on a note of forced whimsy."

Accolades

Home media
Cast Away was released on DVD and VHS on June 12, 2001. The DVD version of the film is a THX certified two-disc Special Edition release that features a DTS 5.1 audio track and several bonus features, including galleries, special effects vignettes, audio commentary, trailers, TV spots, behind-the-scenes footage, interviews, featurettes and more. It became the fastest-selling DVD release in 20th Century Fox history, selling 1.8 million copies and surpassing X-Men. Additionally, the film generated $5.5 million in rentals, which broke Traffics record for having the highest DVD rentals. Cast Away would go on to hold this record until 2002 when it was taken by The Fast and the Furious. In total, the film made $57 million in home video sales and $20.6 million in home video rentals during its first week of release, making it the third-highest home video rentals of any film, behind Meet the Parents and The Sixth Sense.

A single-disc DVD version of the film was released alongside Independence Day on May 21, 2002.

In popular culture 
A FedEx commercial during Super Bowl XXXVII parodied the final scene of the film, in which Chuck Noland returns a package to its sender. In this version, the woman answers the door, and when Noland asks what was in the box, the woman replies: "Just a satellite phone, GPS locator, fishing rod, water purifier, and some seeds. Just silly stuff."

Media executive Lloyd Braun of ABC Studios first suggested the idea of a Cast Away–type television series at a dinner party in 2003. Thom Sherman later pitched the idea for Cast Away – The Series, but never developed the idea. The concept was later developed and pitched with the title Nowhere, which later turned into the ABC show Lost.

The second episode of the seventh season of It's Always Sunny in Philadelphia, "The Gang Goes to the Jersey Shore" refers to a Cast Away scene. When Frank loses his "rum ham" while floating on a raft in the Atlantic Ocean, his anguish resembles that of Tom Hanks's character losing a volleyball he named "Wilson."

On December 31, 2002, at Madison Square Garden, Phish played a clip from the film on the jumbotron to introduce their song "Wilson" during their concert. They later introduced "Tom Hanks" during the song onstage, but it was later revealed to be keyboardist Page McConnell's brother Steve.

On April 15, 2022, at Progressive Field, Tom Hanks threw the ceremonial first pitch at the Cleveland Guardians home opener, accompanied by a replica of Wilson from the movie.

In the survival video game Don't Starve, the main character Wilson is named after the volleyball.

Owl City's song "Kelly Time" references the film from the perspective of Wilson.

References

External links 

 
 
 
 

2000 films
2000s adventure drama films
American adventure drama films
American Christmas films
American survival films
2000 drama films
Films about aviation accidents or incidents
Films about castaways
Films set in 1995
Films set in 1999
Films set in 2000
Films set in Oceania
Films set on uninhabited islands
Films shot in Fiji
Films shot in Los Angeles
Films shot in Russia
Films shot in Texas
Films featuring a Best Drama Actor Golden Globe winning performance
2000s American films
2000s English-language films
Films set on beaches
Films about FedEx
Films scored by Alan Silvestri
Films produced by Tom Hanks
Films produced by Robert Zemeckis
Films directed by Robert Zemeckis
20th Century Fox films
DreamWorks Pictures films
ImageMovers films
Playtone films
CJ Entertainment films